XHRVI-FM is a radio station on 106.3 FM in Villahermosa, Tabasco, Mexico, with transmitter in Ixtacomitán. XHRVI-FM is owned by Capital Media and carries its Lokura FM adult hits format.

History

XERV-AM 1190 received its concession on April 13, 1992. The Villahermosa-based XERV was owned by Erasto Huerta Mendoza and broadcast with up to 10,000 watts daytime (though it only ever used 2,500) and 500 watts at night. Radio Villa acquired XERV in 2000 and Capital bought the station in 2005.

XERVI was approved to migrate to FM on June 4, 2010, becoming XHRVI-FM 106.3. To not conflict with the existing XHRV-FM, an I was added for Ixtacomitán, where transmitter is located.

The station flipped from English classic hits as Capital FM to grupera as Capital Máxima on August 13, 2019. On October 1, the station changed formats again, to news/talk as Heraldo Radio. On March 1, 2021, the station changed formats again, from news/talk to Spanish adult hits as Lokura FM.

References

Radio stations in Tabasco